Rosalind Mary Owens (born 12 November 1944), known as Tuppy Owens, is an English sex therapist, consultant, campaigner, writer and former adult model.

Education
Born in Cambridge, Owens gained a degree in zoology from Exeter University, and then worked in ecology in Africa and Trinidad. She settled in London, and worked as a scientific administrator at the Natural Environment Research Council. Then, in the late 1960s, she established a sex education book publishing company, for which she wrote and published The Sex Maniac's Diary successfully between 1972 and 1995, and which she operated as a thriving business from her Mayfair flat — for example, the 1975 Sex Maniac's Diary was launched in August 1974 with a reception at the Bristol Hotel in London which was reported on the following day in the Financial Times.

Work

From 1974, Owens also began lecturing on the subject of sex.  In 1975, she appeared in the Dutch pornographic film Sensations. From 1984, the Sex Maniac's Diary was published as The Safer Sex Maniac's Diary and provided the first visual instructions to the public on how to put a condom on securely; it also reviewed condoms and offered safer sex advice, all at the beginning of the outbreak of HIV.

In 1979, Owens started the Outsiders Club for socially and physically disabled people to find partners. She was helped by Nigel Verbeek, who had recently lost his sight. Both worked voluntarily, which Owens continues to do today. Outsiders is a club providing peer support to members, an online Clubhouse, and monthly lunches around the country.

In order to ensure that she answered the members' questions with accuracy, Owens trained as a sex therapist at St George's Hospital Medical School in London, where she gained a diploma in Human Sexuality in 1986. She was also subsequently awarded an Honorary Doctorate from the Institute of Advanced Study of Human Sexuality in San Francisco. In 2009, Owens was named one of the Family Planning Association's 80 most influential achievers in the field of family planning.

For disabled men and women who want to learn what pleasures their bodies are capable of enjoying, and how to please a partner, Owens set up the TLC Trust website, where they can find responsible, safe sexual services.

In 1981, Owens appeared in the English pornographic film Lady Victoria's Training, which was produced by Mike Freeman/Videx and featured Simon Lindsay Honey, who went on to work as a porn producer and actor under the pseudonym Ben Dover.

In the 1990s, after more than 30 years living in London, Owens moved to a croft in the north of Scotland.

In 2005, Owens founded the Sexual Health and Disability Alliance (SHADA) to bring together health professionals interested in sex and disability. In November 2009, a conference with the title "Disability: Sex, Relationships and Pleasure" was held by SHADA with the Royal Society of Medicine. Owens produced the Sexual Respect Tool Kit, and started the sexual advocacy service, ASAP. She also answers the Sex and Disability Helpline. Her book "Supporting Disabled People with their Sexual Lives" was published by Jessica Kingsley on 19 November 2014.

Owens remains active in running Outsiders. At the same time, she also advises the promoter of the Sexual Freedom Ball to fund Outsiders, and the organisers of the fundraiser, The Erotic Awards, now called The Sexual Services and Entertainment Awards.

Owens is now the chair of the Sexual Freedom Coalition. Back in the 90s Owens worked campaigning with Prostitution Pride, parades through London, which were funded by Arcadia events in North London.

Owens has been working with Designability (formerly the Bath Institute of Medical Engineering) in the hope that they will be able to create sex toys that can be used by disabled people who, without them, cannot masturbate.

Owens will be the editor of a forthcoming website, The School of Sex for Disabled People, which is being created by sexually experienced disabled people and those who provide them with sexual services. She is currently writing her autobiography.

Award
Owens has won the 2015 Lifetime Achievement Award from the European Lifestyles Awards. She is also a Winner of the Innovation Award of Sexual Health and Human Rights UNESCO 2015.
She was a finalist (Lifetime Achievement) in the Directory of Social Change Awards 2015.

Publications
 Photographs of caterpillars in Trinidad Scientific American: August 1967
 Sexual Harmony. London: Highbury Press, 1969
 Love in the Open Air. London: Cand Haven Ltd., 1970
 The Sex Maniac's Diary. London: Cand Haven Ltd., 1972-1995 (from 1987 called The Safer Sex Maniac's Diary)
 Column in Club International. London: Paul Raymond Publications, 1975–6
 Take Me I'm Yours. Edinburgh: Paul Harris Publishing, 1978
 Mothercare Diary. London: Reader's Digest, 1980
 Practical Suggestions. London: Outsiders Trust, from 1980 to present
 Emotions in Focus — catalogue of the Exhibition of the same name which opened at The Round House in 1983 (International Year of Disabled People). London: the Outsiders Trust, 1983
 INSIDE. London: the Outsiders Trust, 1984–1998 and 2002–present
 The Sex Maniac's Bible. London: Cand Haven Ltd., 1989
 The Sex Maniac's Address Book. London: Cand Haven Ltd., 1989
 Little Book of Delights (annually). London: the Leydig Trust, 1989–present
 The Organ monthly. London: Cand Haven Ltd., 1990–1993
 The Making of Sensations. New York: Rhinoceros, 1993
 Introduction to Half Dressed, She Obeyed. Stockport: Divine Press, 1993
 The Politically Correct Guide to Getting Laid. London: Cand Haven Ltd., 1995
 The Sexual Skills and Needs of Disabled Men — A Female Perspective Sexuality & Disability Journal. New York: Kluwer Academic/Human Sciences Press, 1996
 Planet Sex — The Handbook. London: Cand Haven Ltd,  1996
 Disabled People Make the Best Clients presented at the ICOP Conference, Los Angeles 1997 and then globally
 A column in Desire 2000–2008
 Contributions to The Sex Book. London: Cassells, 2002
 Foreword to Baby Oil and Ice. London: The Do-Not Press, 2002
 Columns in Forum and Erotic Review,  2005–2009
 Content for the Sex and Disability section of the Lovers' Guide website 2007
 Philip's Aspidistra: the Owens' Bequest in About Larkin, Journal of the Philip Larkin Society No 24, October 2007
 Sex and Disability, an article on TheSite.org, Youthnet, 2009
 Chapters in A Guide to Sexual Dysfunction in Men. Leicestershire: Troubador Publishing Ltd., 2010
 Ten Things to Know About Sex and Disability. London: Royal College of Art and Imperial College, 2010
 Chapter entitled Disability and Sex Work  in book Queer Sex Work, Taylor and Francis Books 2014
 Supporting Disabled People with their Sexual Lives, — a clear guide for health and social care professionals  Jessica Kingsley 2014

References

External links
 Official site
 Website of Outsiders
 Website of SHADA (the Sexual Health and Disability Alliance)

1944 births
Living people
English female adult models
English pornographic film actresses
Sex educators
People from Cambridge
Alumni of the University of Exeter
Sex therapists